Chinandega Airport (Spanish: Pista Aérea Germán Pomares Ordoñez)  is an airport serving Chinandega, the capital of the Chinandega Department of Nicaragua. The airport is on the northwest edge of the city.

History
In the early 1980s, the airstrip was used primarily by light aircraft for aerial fumigation. The Chinandega Airport, also known as the El Picacho Airport, was renovated in 2010 by the Nicaraguan Civil Aeronautics Authority (INAC).

See also

 List of airports in Nicaragua
 Transport in Nicaragua

References

External links
 OpenStreetMap - Chinandega
OurAirports - Chinandega

Airports in Nicaragua
Chinandega Department